74 Aquarii (abbreviated 74 Aqr) is a triple star system in the constellation of Aquarius. 74 Aquarii is its Flamsteed designation and it also bears the variable star designation HI Aquarii.

Visual binary
The two components are referred to as A and B or AB and C in different publications. In 2010, this component was at an angular separation of 0.069 arcseconds along a position angle of 285.9°.

Spectroscopic binary
The primary star of the visual pair is a double-lined spectroscopic binary, where the presence of both components is revealed from the Doppler shift of their spectral lines, meaning 74 Aquarii is a triple system.  The spectroscopic binary was discovered and the orbit calculated by Richard J. Wolff of the University of Hawaii in 1974. A refined orbit was calculated in 2004 by Italian astronomers Giovanni Catanzaro and Paolo Leto in 2004. The orbital period is 3.4 days and the orbit is nearly circular.

Components
The three stars have a combined spectral type of B8 or B9 and all three are thought to be similar.  It is unclear whether the stars are on the main sequence, subgiants, or giant stars. The two visual components are both chemically peculiar stars, the brighter of the two being a mercury-manganese star and the fainter an Ap/Bp star with an excess of mercury.  74 Aquarii is an a2 CVn variable star, with a total amplitude of just 0.01 magnitudes, and a period of 3.5892 days.

References

External links
 Image 74 Aquarii

Aquarius (constellation)
Aquarii, 074
216494
Triple star systems
Spectroscopic binaries
Alpha2 Canum Venaticorum variables
8704
113031
Durchmusterung objects
Aquarii, HI
Mercury-manganese stars